Jach'a Sirka (Aymara jach'a big, sirka vein of the body or a mine, "big vein", hispanicized spellings Jacha Circa, Jachacirca) is a mountain in the Andes of southern Peru, about  high. It is located in the Moquegua Region, Mariscal Nieto Province, Carumas District. Jach'a Sirka lies northeast of Chiñi Lakha and southeast of Tixani.

References

Mountains of Moquegua Region
Mountains of Peru